The Roma–Ciudad Miguel Alemán International Bridge is a suspension bridge that spans the Rio Grande (known as Rio Bravo in Mexico) between Roma, Texas, and Ciudad Miguel Alemán, Tamaulipas.

The bridge was built in 1928. It is a National Historic Landmark in the United States and in Mexico. Roma was a prosperous riverport in the 19th century. Historic structures front a plaza overlooking the Rio Grande with a view of the bridge.

In 2016, the Texas and Mexico sections of the American Society of Civil Engineers declared the bridge a Historic Civil Engineering Landmark.

Border crossing 

The Roma Port of Entry was established in 1928 with the construction of the first suspension bridge.

References

External links
 

International bridges in Texas
International bridges in Tamaulipas
Bridges completed in 1928
Buildings and structures in Starr County, Texas
Suspension bridges in Texas
Suspension bridges in Mexico
Transportation in Starr County, Texas
Road bridges in Texas
Toll bridges in Texas
Toll bridges in Mexico
Towers in Texas
Towers in Mexico